Karu Simon Elisha is a Nigerian politician and a member of the Nigerian National Assembly delegation from Gombe State at the 9th National Assembly (Nigeria).

Simon Elisha is representing Kaltungo/Shongom Federal constituency on the platform of the All Progressive Congress (APC).

References 

Politicians from Gombe State
Members of the National Assembly (Nigeria)
Year of birth missing (living people)
Living people